Arthur Nelson (15 May 1909 – 1977) was an English footballer who played for Hull City, Stockport County and Luton Town in the Football League.

References

1909 births
1977 deaths
English footballers
Association football forwards
Hull City A.F.C. players
Scarborough F.C. players
Notts County F.C. players
Stockport County F.C. players
Luton Town F.C. players
Nuneaton Borough F.C. players
Telford United F.C. players
Burton Town F.C. players
English Football League players